HD 93607 (HR 4222) is a star in the constellation Carina. Its apparent magnitude is 4.87. Its parent cluster is IC 2602.

HD 93607 is a B4 main sequence star, although older spectral studies classified it as a subgiant.  It is included on a list of the least variable stars amongst those observed by the Hipparcos satellite, with a possible variation less than 0.01 magnitudes.

HD 93607 lies in the core region of the bright open cluster IC 3602.  Its age is uncertain but around 17 million years.

References

Carina (constellation)
B-type subgiants
093607
Carinae, 238
IC 2602
4222
052736
Durchmusterung objects
B-type main-sequence stars